There and Now: Live in Vancouver 1968 [sic] was a 1990 (or early 1991) archival release of a concert by Phil Ochs in Vancouver, British Columbia, Canada, at the PNE Garden Auditorium on Thursday, March 13, 1969.  Performing solo with guitar (except on "The Bells," where Allen Ginsberg played the bells), Ochs was worn, weary and despairing in the aftermath of the 1968 Democratic National Convention in Chicago. Ochs presents some of his older material, such as "There But For Fortune," "Changes" and "The Highwayman," alongside then-new songs from the as-yet-unreleased Rehearsals for Retirement such as "The Doll House" and "William Butler Yeats Visits Lincoln Park and Escapes Unscathed."  The album thus documents two eras of Ochs in one seventy-minute show.

A note about the release date

The CD liner indicates that There and Now: Live in Vancouver was originally released in 1990, but the original release date was January 1991 according to the discographical information included with the Farewells & Fantasies box set.

Track listing
All songs by Phil Ochs unless otherwise noted.
"There But for Fortune" – 3:02
"Outside of a Small Circle of Friends" – 4:04
"Where Were You in Chicago? / William Butler Yeats Visits Lincoln Park and Escapes Unscathed" – 5:05
"The Scorpion Departs But Never Returns" – 4:41
"Pleasures of the Harbor" – 7:07
"The World Began in Eden and Ended in Los Angeles" – 3:22
"The Bells" (Edgar Allan Poe with musical interpretation by Phil Ochs)  – 3:12
"The Highwayman" (Alfred Noyes with musical interpretation by Phil Ochs)  – 6:54
"I Kill Therefore I Am" – 3:50
"The Doll House" – 4:08
"Another Age" – 4:56
"Changes" – 4:45
"Crucifixion"  – 8:01
"I Ain't Marching Anymore" – 4:25

Personnel
Phil Ochs - guitar, vocals
Allen Ginsberg - bells (on "The Bells" only)

References

External links
 Photographs of the concert

Culture of Vancouver
Phil Ochs live albums
1990 live albums